Star Trek: Starfleet Academy is a Star Trek PC simulation game developed and published by Interplay in 1997. The game simulates the life of a typical Starfleet cadet, with the player learning the basics of flying a starship and engaging in roleplaying with a crew of cadets, with the eventual goal of becoming captain of their own ship. The game included full motion video featuring William Shatner, Walter Koenig, and George Takei reprising their roles from the original television series and movies, and a multiplayer simulation mode allowing for up to 32 players.

A tie-in novelization by Diane Carey was released by Pocket Books in June 1997. The game received an expansion pack in 1998 titled Chekov's Lost Missions and a sequel was released in 2000 called Star Trek: Klingon Academy. Abridged versions of the base game were also released with the subtitles Cadet Briefing and Strategic Command.

Gameplay
The player takes the role of human cadet David Forester, leader of a cadet group at Starfleet's San Francisco–based Command College. The player has to pass all the simulated missions, optionally including the Kobayashi Maru scenario depicted in Star Trek II: The Wrath of Khan. In addition to simple combat situations, the scenarios include more complex missions such as a re-creation of Kirk's near-disastrous starship confrontation with Khan Noonien Singh, which Kirk ruefully admits is used to teach cadets to avoid his serious mistake that nearly doomed his ship. In addition, between simulator scenarios, the player must supervise Forester's crew interactions and prevent personality clashes from lowering team performance by choosing the right dialogue options during cutscenes.

The cadet crew consists of a Vulcan science officer called Sturek, an Andorian communications officer named Vanda M'Giia, and a detached and shy human engineer named Robin Brady, with Trill Jana Akton at the helm and human Geoff Corin at navigation.

During the course of the game it is possible to foil the machinations of the Vanguard – a fanatical terrorist group dedicated to overthrowing the Federation government and installing Kirk as a despot – and to investigate the cause of increasing tensions around the Klingon Neutral Zone. It is also possible to be dismissed from the Academy in disgrace if the wrong choice is made during certain cutscenes.

The game has a multiplayer starship combat mode that allows up to 32 players to play together.

Development
On the PC, the game is enhanced with numerous interactive live action (full motion video) scenes that can affect crew performance, and a storyline involving the Vanguard, a fictional terrorist group that appears only in this game. These scenes feature William Shatner as Captain James T. Kirk, Walter Koenig as Pavel Chekov, and George Takei as Captain Hikaru Sulu, as celebrity guest instructors at the school. The motion sequence director, Martin Denning, pioneered the use of green-screen filming to enable the camera to be moved freely in synch with the 3D CGI backgrounds - the first time this had ever been done. Interplay contracted Ron Jones, composer for several Star Trek: The Next Generation episodes, for the game's soundtrack, a CD of which was included in some versions of the game. Other versions came with an exclusive 3" metal miniature figure of the female Andorian cadet, Vanda M'Giia. Pocket Books released a novelization by Diane Carey.

The PC game received an expansion pack called Chekov's Lost Missions in 1998 that features seven new missions, two new multiplayer games, and various improvements to the game interface. Walter Koenig and George Takei make return appearances in the introductions to several of the new missions.

Interplay also announced a PlayStation version of the game, but it was not released.

Reception

Reviews were generally middling. Pelits Niko Nirvi criticized that the PC version is unfinished and the flight model doesn't resemble Star Trek but is instead too similar to Wing Commander. Next Generation likewise opined that the simulation has the overall feel of flying a tiny fighter rather than commanding the large starships of the Star Trek universe, making it feel like just another Wing Commander clone, albeit a well-made one with high production values. GamePro also praised the game's high production values, noting the detailed texture maps, musical score, and use of sound effects from the television shows, but concluded that while Star Trek fans would enjoy the game, all others would be better off with Star Wars: X-Wing vs. TIE Fighter. Chris Gregson of GameSpot said the game suffered from having been put on hold while the producer worked on other projects, resulting in outdated gameplay and visuals at the time of release. He also felt the reliance on full motion video gave the sequences at the academy a non-interactive feel, and that while making the actual simulator portion a Wing Commander clone may have been a good idea, it does not hold up well against other Wing Commander clones due to its unnecessary busywork, limited arsenal, and average graphics.

Sales of the game reached 40,000 units within four days of its release. According to Interplay, its global sales surpassed 350,000 copies by mid-1998.

The game was a finalist for the Academy of Interactive Arts & Sciences' 1997 "Simulation Game of the Year", "Outstanding Achievement in Sound and Music" and "Outstanding Achievement in Software Engineering" awards. However, these categories went to Microsoft Flight Simulator 98, PaRappa the Rapper and GoldenEye 007, respectively. The game won the award for "Most Disappointing Game of the Year" in GameSpots Best & Worst Awards for 1997.

Legacy

A follow-up game was released in 2000: Star Trek: Klingon Academy.

On YouTube, a fan edit of cutscenes from Starfleet Academy and Klingon Academy was released under the name Star Trek - Starfleet Academy (The Movie).

See also
 Star Trek: Starfleet Academy - Starship Bridge Simulator

Notes

References

External links
 
 

1997 video games
Cancelled PlayStation (console) games
Interplay Entertainment games
Classic Mac OS games
Multiplayer and single-player video games
School-themed video games
Starfleet Academy
Starfleet Academy
Video games with expansion packs
Windows games
Star Trek video games using television cast members
Video games developed in the United States